Rev. John William Otto Brenner (July 11, 1874 – September 30, 1962) was an American Lutheran minister who served as president of the Wisconsin Evangelical Lutheran Synod from 1933 to 1953.

Benner was born in Hustisford, Wisconsin. In 1896, he graduated from Wisconsin Lutheran Seminary in Mequon, Wisconsin. He served as pastor of Saint John's Evangelical Lutheran Church in Milwaukee, Wisconsin, until 1958. He served on the board of Northwestern College in Watertown, Wisconsin, and of Wisconsin Lutheran Seminary.

References

External links
Wisconsin Evangelical Lutheran Synod

1874 births
1962 deaths
People from Hustisford, Wisconsin
Martin Luther College
Religious leaders from Milwaukee
People from Bay City, Michigan
American Lutheran theologians
20th-century American Lutheran clergy
Wisconsin Evangelical Lutheran Synod

19th-century Lutheran theologians
20th-century Lutheran theologians